The Royal Conservatory of Music is a music school and performance venue in Toronto, Canada.

Royal Conservatory may also refer to:

 Madrid Royal Conservatory, Spain
 Royal Academy of Music, London, United Kingdom
 Royal Birmingham Conservatoire
 Royal College of Music (RCM), London, United Kingdom
 Royal College of Music, Stockholm, Sweden
 Royal Conservatoire of Antwerp, Belgium
 Royal Conservatoire of Scotland, U.K.
 Royal Conservatory of Brussels, Belgium
 Royal Conservatory of Ghent, Belgium
 Royal Conservatory of The Hague, Netherlands
 Royal Conservatory of Liège, Belgium
 Royal Irish Academy of Music, Dublin, Ireland
 Royal Northern College of Music, Manchester, U.K.
 Royal Welsh College of Music & Drama, Wales
 Hochschule für Musik Carl Maria von Weber, Germany

See also
Royal College